Acácio Cordeiro Barreto (born 20 January 1959), best known as Acácio, is a Brazilian former  football (soccer) player, who played as a goalkeeper, best known for his performances for Vasco da Gama. He was born in Campos dos Goytacazes, Rio de Janeiro State.

During his career (1978–1996) he played for Americano, Serrano, Vasco da Gama, Madureira and in Portugal with Tirsense and Beira-Mar. He won three Campeonato Carioca (1982, 1987, 1988) and one Campeonato Brasileiro Série A (1989). For the Brazilian team he played seven matches in 1989, and was part of the 1990 FIFA World Cup roster as an unused substitute.

He was assistant coach Paulo Cesar Gusmao in Ceará and Vasco da Gama. In 2011, he began his coaching career in Americano, revealed that the club as a player. months after hit to be the commander of Olaria, where he stayed for a short time. months later, he returned to command the Americano.

References

External links 
 
 
 

1959 births
Living people
1983 Copa América players
1989 Copa América players
1990 FIFA World Cup players
Americano Futebol Clube players
Brazil international footballers
Brazilian expatriate footballers
Brazilian expatriate sportspeople in Portugal
Brazilian footballers
Campeonato Brasileiro Série A players
CR Vasco da Gama players
Expatriate footballers in Portugal
Association football goalkeepers
Madureira Esporte Clube players
People from Campos dos Goytacazes
S.C. Beira-Mar players
Americano Futebol Clube managers
Olaria Atlético Clube managers
Madureira Esporte Clube managers
Copa América-winning players
Brazilian football managers
Sportspeople from Rio de Janeiro (state)